Molecular Pain is a peer-reviewed open access medical journal covering all aspects of research on pain. It was established in 2005 and is published by BioMed Central. The editors-in-chief are Jianguo Gu (University of Alabama at Birmingham) and Min Zhuo (University of Toronto), who was also the founding editor of the journal. It is sponsored by the University of Cincinnati College of Medicine.

Abstracting and indexing 
The journal is abstracted and indexed in:

According to the Journal Citation Reports, the journal has a 2012 impact factor of 3.774.

References

External links 
 

Neuroscience journals
Anesthesiology and palliative medicine journals
BioMed Central academic journals
Creative Commons Attribution-licensed journals
English-language journals
Publications established in 2005